The Church of the Deaf or Deaf People's Church (Døves Kirke) is a church in Copenhagen, on Falkonergårdsvej in the Frederiksberg Municipality.

History
On December 1, 1900, Johannes Jørgensen, the first deaf priest in Denmark, established the first deaf congregation in Europe. The Church of the Deaf was founded on November 12, 1900, in Copenhagen. The church was built on designs by Emil Jørgensen in the National Romantic style. It was constructed by master builder  Albert Nicolai Schioldann. Schioldann, who had a deaf son, was very active in Copenhagen's deaf community and would later serve on the board of the church.

The church was completed in 1904 and consecrated on December 18, 1904. The church was built on the initiative of the Association of Effata, the Workers' Home for Deaf-Dumb Women and the Deaf Society of 1866.

In 1934 services was celebrated using the Danish language. There were two worship services held on Sundays, using the sign language and the other in spoken language. In 2000, the  congregations celebrated their 100th anniversary and, for the first time, published a translation of Hebrew and Greek texts from the Bible into Danish sign language. In 2001 a new church house was inaugurated. On February 3, 2013, the Sign language Bible was inaugurated during a service attended by Queen Margrethe II of Denmark. On May 14, 2014, the Danish sign language was recognized as a language, an occasion which was commemorated that same evening during a service.

References

1904 establishments in Denmark
Lutheran churches in Copenhagen
20th-century Church of Denmark churches
Churches for the deaf
Churches in the Diocese of Copenhagen